Susie Bell was a popular nineteenth century nautical tune collected by Frederick Augustus Packer around the port at Hobart, in Tasmania. First published in 1882 London. The song is dedicated to the blue jacket sailors of the Australian Squadron, stationed in Australia. The lyrics are a rollicking Australian response to Nancy Lee written by Stephen Adams

Lyrics

Performances
1883 Hobart 
1885 Hobart 
1886 Tasmania 
1894 Melbourne, Victoria 
1894 Launceston 
1901 Bunbury, Western Australia 
1906 Tasmania 
1907 Tasmaina 
1930 Hobart 
 1936 Hobart

References

Australian songs
1882 songs
Songwriter unknown